Oria may be an alternative spelling for:

Oriya language (India)
Orya language (New Guinea)